Flowery Mound is an archaeological site in Tensas Parish, Louisiana with components from the Late Coles Creek and Plaquemine-Mississippian culture which dates from approximately 950–1541.

Description
The site is located on Andrews Bayou. Core samples taken during investigations at the site have revealed the mound was built in a single stage and because the fill types can still be differentiated it suggests the mound is relatively young. Radiocarbon dating of charcoal found in a midden under the mound reveals that the site was occupied from 996–1162 during the Coles Creek period. The mound was built over the midden between 1200–1541 during the Plaquemine/Mississippian period. This was further confirmed by stylistic analysis of pottery found at the site.

See also
Culture, phase, and chronological table for the Mississippi Valley
Balmoral Mounds
Ghost Site Mounds
Sundown Mounds

References

Natchez
Archaeological sites of the Coles Creek culture
Plaquemine Mississippian culture
Mounds in Louisiana
Geography of Tensas Parish, Louisiana